Syed Mehdi Hasan (born 3 February 1990) is an Indian cricketer who plays for Hyderabad. He made his Twenty20 debut on 10 January 2016 in the 2015–16 Syed Mushtaq Ali Trophy. In January 2018, he was bought by the Sunrisers Hyderabad in the 2018 IPL auction for Rs. 20 Lakhs.

He was the leading wicket-taker for Hyderabad in the 2018–19 Vijay Hazare Trophy, with fifteen dismissals in eight matches.

References

External links
 

1990 births
Living people
Indian cricketers
Hyderabad cricketers
Cricketers from Hyderabad, India